Cervantine is A Hawk and a Hacksaw's fifth studio album, and the first to be released on the new label, L.M. Dupli-cation. The album's sound stands out from previous recordings, drawing a stronger influence from Greek Romani music, and the mariachi that had surrounded the group in New Mexico.

Track listing
 "No Rest For The Wicked" - 8:23
 "Mana Thelo Enan Andra" (traditional song) - 3:54
 "Espanola Kolo" - 5:34
 "Cervantine" - 5:50
 "Üskudar" - 4:08
 "Lazslo Lassú" - 3:50
 "At The Vulturul Negru" - 4:46
 "The Loser (Xeftilis)" - 3:56

Personnel
Jeremy Barnes - accordion
Heather Trost - violin
Stephanie Hladowski - vocals ("Mana Thelo Enan Andra", "Uskudar")
Chris Hladowski - bouzouki
Issa Malluf - doumbek and riq

References

2011 albums
A Hawk and a Hacksaw albums